Juan López (born 14 February 1926, date of death unknown) was a Uruguayan sprinter. He competed in the men's 100 metres at the 1948 Summer Olympics.

Competition record

References

1926 births
Year of death missing
Athletes (track and field) at the 1948 Summer Olympics
Uruguayan male sprinters
Olympic athletes of Uruguay
Place of birth missing